Lev Martyushev (19 November 1880 – 20 December 1937) was a Russian Empire fencer. He competed in three events at the 1912 Summer Olympics.

References

1880 births
1937 deaths
Male fencers from the Russian Empire
Olympic competitors for the Russian Empire
Fencers at the 1912 Summer Olympics